Nebahovy is a municipality and village in Prachatice District in the South Bohemian Region of the Czech Republic. It has about 600 inhabitants.

Administrative parts
Villages of Jelemek, Kralovice, Lažišťka and Zdenice are administrative parts of Nebahovy.

References

External links

Villages in Prachatice District